Thomas Arthur (July 12, 1860 – September 15, 1925) was a justice of the Iowa Supreme Court from September 15, 1920, until his death on September 15, 1925, appointed from Harrison County, Iowa.

Born on a farm in Harrison County, Iowa, Arthur attended rural schools and received his law degree from the State University of Iowa in 1881. A Republican, Arthur served as a district court judge from 1911 to 1920, when he was appointed to the supreme court.

Arthur died at Iowa Methodist Hospital at the age of 65, following a heart attack in his office that morning.

References

External links

1860 births
1925 deaths
Iowa Republicans
People from Harrison County, Iowa
University of Iowa College of Law alumni
Justices of the Iowa Supreme Court
20th-century American judges